TransInvestService (TIS) is a large Ukrainian private terminal operator and stevedore operating in the Pivdennyi Port. In 2018, the company's cargo turnover reached 25.7 million tons. TIS operates its own cargo terminals in Small Adzhalyk Estuary, which is in the Pivdennyi Port water area 22 km north-east of Odessa. TIS Group owns five modern terminals: TIS Grain, TIS Mineral Fertilizers, TIS Ore, TIS Coal and TIS Container Terminal.
TransInvestService owns and manages all service infrastructure facilities, including an in-house railway station.

TIS was the first in the port sector to develop and test a public-private partnership arrangement for areas that had no regulations or relevant precedents. Between 2006 and 2010, the company invested $40 million in bottom dredging near its berths. A law regulating the status of private investors in ports was adopted in 2012 only, and the Ministry of Infrastructure issued an order, which elaborated regulations to compensate for the money channeled by private investors into improvement works and bottom dredging, in 2015 only.

Company history 

Alexey Stavintser and Oleg Kutateladze founded the company on an abandoned construction site of Liman state-owned company in 1994. The owners bought out the government's stake in the course of the company's development.

In 1994, they invested into abandoned facilities for rock phosphate imports at berth No.17. The raw materials were meant for a chemical plant under construction in Berezovka, Odessa Oblast. The construction which started in 1987 was never finished. However, an inter-governmental expert commission stopped the project. Involving environmental activists of Odessa region, the commission was set up by USSR Communist Party General Secretary Mikhail Gorbachev in response to protests of Novye Bilyary residents. The project was mothballed to be further converted to handle other bulk cargoes. Between 1987 and 1994, the facilities were neglected and handled cargoes very rarely because of the overall economic downturn and their remoteness from state Commercial Port Yuzhny.

When Alexey Stavintser and Oleg Kutateladze bought the stake, they started converting the facilities from imports into exports. Later they began offering fertilizer transshipment services. This was the start of the TIS Group development. Since September 1994, the company invested heavily to build six in-house berths with a total length of over 1,300 m and depth of 15 m, dredge 50 ha of the estuary bottom by 6.5 million cu m and excavate over 7 million cu m of onshore soil.

Berths and Terminals 

Berth 15 — TIS has built it as an auxiliary facility of the grain terminal for small vessels.

Berth 16 — TIS Grain is the Black Sea's biggest grain terminal with the annual capacity of 
5.5-6 million tons. Completed in 1999, the facility is now 250 m long and 14 m deep. The storage capacity is 370,000 tons.

Berth 17 — TIS Mineral Fertilizers is Ukraine's second biggest terminal for fertilizer exports after Odessa Port Plant. It is 283 long and 14 m deep. The terminal's annual capacity is 3.5 million tons.

Berth 18 — TIS Ore terminal is a joint venture of TIS and Ferrexpo (Poltava GOK) to transship iron ore and pellets. Built in 2004, the facility has the annual capacity of five to six million tons. It is 250 long and 15 m deep.

Berths 19 and 20 — TIS Coal is the CIS biggest coal and ore terminal with the annual capacity of 12 million tons. Built in 2008, the berths are 500 long and 15 m deep. The storage capacity is 1 million cubic meters. In April 2012, the terminal accommodated Maxi Brazil, a 259,000 DWT bulker and the biggest vessel that ever docked in Ukraine.

Berths 21 and 22 — TIS Container Terminal is the Black Sea's newest terminal built in 2009. It is 600 m long and 15 m deep. The Phase 1 capacity is 400,000 TEU, while the maximum capacity is up to 2M TEU. Since November 2011, the facility has been serving ECUMED, a weekly liner service of Maersk Line. As of November 2011, the terminal has been servicing Maersk Line's ECUMED, a weekly liner service connecting Ecuador and the Black Sea, and, starting April 2018 — Maersk Line's ME-3 service.

Infrastructure 

TransInvestService owns and manages all service infrastructure facilities in the terminals, including an in-house railway station.

In 2018, TIS handled over 335 053 railway cars.

Since 2012, TIS Container Terminal has been operating Vizirka site for motor vehicle arrivals. This helps streamline and simplify all cargo processing and manifesting procedures for cargo owners. Vizirka operates a one-stop office with a customs unit, information desk and offices of other regulatory bodies.

TIS invests heavily in the development of regular containerized rail transportation. In September 2017 the company was the first among Ukrainian ports to launch the container train from the TIS port to Dnipro. Throughout 2018, trains were launched in three new directions: Kyiv in January 2018, Ternopil and Kharkiv in the 3rd quarter of 2018. Last year, TIS container trains transported 27,683 TEU or 33.4% of Ukraine's total containerized rail cargo turnover.

Industrial Prizes, Awards and Records 

 Absolute Growth — 2008, 2009, 2011, 2013, 2017

Legal actions 

In 1994, the company was set to cooperate with Norsk Hydro. However, the cooperation failed, as the Norwegian party defaulted on its commitments. Nonetheless, Norsk Hydro initiated lengthy judicial proceedings that ended in the Stockholm Court in 2008. The court ruled that Norsk Hydro's claims were legally baseless.

In summer and spring 2009, TIS was involved into a public conflict with the management of the neighboring Yuzhny Port. The management had accused TIS of raider attacks and intentions to drive Yuzhny Port to bankruptcy. TransInvestService rebutted the allegations, stating that the port's management acted deliberately to derail TIS's investment plans. The conflict resulted in a two weeks downtime in outer roads for Scan Oceanic, a British vessel that had a coal loader on board, and put Zhen Hua 11 berthing at threat. The latter brought equipment for the container terminal. The conflict stopped to be public in October 2009 after berths 21 and 22 were introduced to the Port Mandatory Regulations and the Yuzhny Port manager was dismissed.

References 

 TIS corporate website
 TIS terminals
 Corporate blog
 Stavintser Foundation
 TIS news on Yuzhny municipal website (online)

Shipping companies of Ukraine
Companies of Ukraine